Alfie Curtis (28 July 193030 November 2017) was a British actor. He played a number of television and film roles, and was best known for an appearance in Star Wars (1977).

Life
Curtis was born in Stepney, London on 28 July 1930.

He was an enthusiastic follower of football and supported Arsenal F.C. For a time, Curtis played as a semi-professional footballer and once played in a match against Arsenal.

Career
Curtis was noted for his "rugged" features. He landed a number of acting parts that demanded a rough physical appearance through Ugly Models, a London modelling agency that specialises in artists and models who do not conform to typical standards of idealised beauty.

Most of Curtis's appearances were in minor roles in British television series. He played the part of Matt Beckett in the TV police drama Cribb (1980–81) and Ted in the TV adaptation of J.B. Priestley's Lost Empires (1986). His cinema roles included an appearance in David Lynch's 1980 film The Elephant Man in which he played the part of a milkman.

He was best known for a small part in the 1977 space opera film Star Wars, in which he played the role of insane Dr. Evazan, a criminal with a heavily scarred face who violently confronts Luke Skywalker in the Mos Eisley Cantina scene. Curtis' character states "I have the death sentence on twelve systems!" In the brief bar brawl, Evazan's partner, Ponda Baba, is injured by Obi-Wan Kenobi, the first use of a lightsaber in combat in the Star Wars franchise.

Death
Curtis died on 30 November 2017 at the age of 87 in Billericay, Essex.

Filmography

References

External links

1930 births
2017 deaths
English male film actors
English male television actors
20th-century English male actors
People from Stepney